This is a list of members of the Victorian Legislative Assembly from 1967 to 1970, as elected at the 1967 state election:

 On 23 July 1968, the Country member for Swan Hill, Harold Stirling, died. Country candidate Henry Broad won the resulting by-election on 14 September 1968.
 In September 1969, the Labor member for Reservoir, Harry Jenkins, Sr., resigned to contest the seat of Scullin at the 1969 federal election. Labor candidate Jim Simmonds was elected unopposed at the close of nominations at the resulting by-election on 27 October 1969.
 In September 1969, the Liberal member for Dandenong, Len Reid, resigned to contest the seat of Holt at the 1969 federal election. Labor candidate Alan Lind won the resulting by-election on 6 December 1969.

Members of the Parliament of Victoria by term
20th-century Australian politicians